Sant'Andrea in Percussina is a frazione of San Casciano Val di Pesa in the Metropolitan City of Florence, Tuscany, Italy.

This small, but long-established village is located between San Casciano Val di Pesa and Florence. Niccolò Machiavelli wrote his treatise The Prince at his home here, the Albergaccio, where he lived when in exile. A small museum is dedicated to the great writer; the villa, now Villa Bossi-Pucci stands close by the Hostel where Machiavelli used to "let off steam".

Nearby is the thirteenth-century church of San Bartolomeo in Faltignano. This once possessed a painting on wood, depicting Saint Andrew, by the school of Agnolo Gaddi; and a Madonna enthroned and saints attributed to the school of Filippino Lippi, today in the church of Chiesa nuova Val di Pesa. Not far from Sant'Andrea in Percussina, just outside Spedaletto, is the twelfth-century church of Santa Maria a Casavecchia, which contains a Della Robbia polychrome altarpiece in terracotta.

Sant'Andrea in Percussina hosts the headquarters of the Chianti Classico wine makers Consortium.

Notes

References

Frazioni of San Casciano in Val di Pesa